Srednji Dolič ( or ) is a settlement in the Municipality of Mislinja in northern Slovenia. It lies at the upper course of the Paka River, in the hills either side of the regional road from Mislinja to Vitanje. The area is part of the traditional region of Carinthia. It is now included in the Carinthia Statistical Region.

Mass grave
Srednji Dolič is the site of a mass grave associated with the Second World War. It contains the remains of an unknown number of Ustaša soldiers.

References

External links
Srednji Dolič on Geopedia

Populated places in the Municipality of Mislinja